This list of Heritage New Zealand-listed places in Grey District contains those buildings and structures that are listed with Heritage New Zealand (formerly known as Historic Places Trust) in Grey District, New Zealand.

Heritage New Zealand is a Crown entity and the national heritage agency. With a head office in Wellington, the Christchurch area office is responsible for the Grey District.

Current listings

Previous listings

Revingtons Hotel at 45–49 Tainui Street in Greymouth was a Spanish Mission–Art Deco style building constructed in 1938, and listed as a Category II building in 1989. It was delisted in September 2020, after commissioners gave permission for it to be demolished. It was deemed too difficult to repair after significant damage from vandals and squatters.

References 

History of the West Coast, New Zealand
Grey